The chestnut-breasted mountain finch (Poospizopsis caesar) is a species of bird in the family Thraupidae.  It is endemic to Peru.  Its natural habitat is subtropical or tropical high-altitude shrubland.

Taxonomy
The species is sometimes placed in the monotypic genus Poospizopsis.

References

chestnut-breasted mountain finch
Birds of the Peruvian Andes
Endemic birds of Peru
chestnut-breasted mountain finch
chestnut-breasted mountain finch
chestnut-breasted mountain finch
Taxonomy articles created by Polbot